Gräpplang Castle is a castle in the municipality of Flums of the Canton of St. Gallen in Switzerland.  It is a Swiss heritage site of national significance.
Gräpplang is mentioned around the middle of the 13th century as the administrative seat of the Hochstift Chur, pledged to Ulrich von Flums in 1292 and sold to the Tschudi family in 1528, whose descendants remained owners until 1767.

See also

 List of castles in Switzerland

References

Cultural property of national significance in the canton of St. Gallen
Castles in the canton of St. Gallen